Yako is a department or commune of Passoré Province in north central Burkina Faso. Its capital is the town of Yako.

Towns and villages

References

Departments of Burkina Faso
Passoré Province